Alderflies are megalopteran insects of the family Sialidae. They are closely related to the dobsonflies and fishflies as well as to the prehistoric Euchauliodidae. All living alderflies – about 66 species all together – are part of the subfamily Sialinae, which contains between one and seven extant genera according to different scientists' views.

Description 
Sialinae have a body length of less than 25 mm (1 inch), long filamentous antennae, and four large dark wings of which the anterior pair is slightly longer than the posterior. They lack ocelli and their fourth tarsal segment is dilated and deeply bilobed. Dead alderfly larvae are used as bait in fishing.

Life cycle 
The females lay a vast number of eggs on grass stems near water. When the larvae are born they drop into the water or the ground nearby it and make their way into their new aquatic biome. The larvae are aquatic, active, armed with strong sharp mandibles, and breathe by means of seven pairs of abdominal branchial filaments. When full sized, which takes between one and two years, they leave the water and spend a quiescent pupal stage on the land before metamorphosis into the sexually mature insect. Adult alderflies stay near to the water in which they had lived when they were younger. Once in their adult stage, they tend to live only 2 to 3 weeks, which they spend mainly in reproducing.

Classification 
In addition to the seven living genera, there are several genera of fossil alderflies.

Family Sialidae
Genus †Dobbertinia Handlirsch 1920 Green Series, Germany, Early Jurassic (Toarcian)
Genus †Sharasialis Ponomarenko 2012 Shar-Teeg, Mongolia, Late Jurassic (Tithonian)
Subfamily Sialinae
Genus Austrosialis Tillyard, [1919]
Species Austrosialis ignicollis Tillyard, [1919]
Species Austrosialis maxmouldsi Theischinger, 1983
Genus †Eosialis Nel et al., 2002
Species †Eosialis dorisi Nel et al., 2002
Genus Indosialis Lestage, 1927
Species Indosialis bannaensis X.-y. Liu et al., 2006
Species Indosialis beskonakensis Nel, 1988
Species Indosialis indica  X.-y. Liu et al., 2008
Species Indosialis minora (Banks, 1920)
Genus Leptosialis Esben-Petersen, 1920
Species Leptosialis africana Esben-Petersen, 1920
Genus Nipponosialis Kuwayama, 1962
Species Nipponosialis amamiensis Kuwayama, 1964
Species Nipponosialis jezoensis (Okamoto, 1910)
Subspecies Nipponosialis jezoensis jezoensis (Okamoto, 1910)
Subspecies Nipponosialis jezoensis kuwayamai Hayashi & Suda, 1995
Species Nipponosialis kumejimae (Okamoto, 1910)
Genus †Proindosialis Nel, 1988
Species †Proindosialis cantalensis Nel, 1988
Genus Protosialis van der Weele, 1909
Species Protosialis afra Navás, (1936)
Species Protosialis americana (Rambur, 1842)
Species Protosialis australiensis (Tillyard, [1919)
Species Protosialis australis Navás, 1927
Species †Protosialis baltica (Wichard, 1997)
Species Protosialis bifasciata (Hagen, 1861)
Species Protosialis bimaculata Banks, 1920
Species Protosialis brasiliensis  Navás, 1936
Species †Protosialis casca (Engel & Grimaldi, 2007)
Species Protosialis chilensis (McLachlan, (1871)
Species Protosialis flammata Penny, (1982)
Species Protosialis flavicollis (Enderlein, 1910)
Species Protosialis hauseri Contreras-Ramos et al., 2005
Species Protosialis madegassa Navás, 1927
Species Protosialis mexicana (Banks, 1901)
Species Protosialis minora Banks, 1920
Species Protosialis nubila Navás, 1933
Species Protosialis ranchograndis Contreras-Ramos, 2006
Species †Protosialis voigti (Wichard & Engel, 2006)
Genus Sialis Latreille, 1802
Species Approximately 90
Species Sialis abchasica Vshivkova, 1985
Species Sialis aequalis Banks, 1920
Species Sialis americana (Rambur, 1842)
Species Sialis annae Vshivkova, 1979
Species Sialis arvalis Ross, 1937
Species Sialis atra Navás, (1928)
Species Sialis bifida Hayashi & Suda, 1997
Species Sialis bilineata Say, 1823
Species Sialis bilobata Whiting, 1991
Species Sialis californica Banks, 1920
Species Sialis chilensis McLachlan, (1871)
Species Sialis concava Banks, 1897
Species Sialis contigua Flint, 1964
Species Sialis cornuta Ross, 1937
Species Sialis didyma Navás, 1916
Species Sialis dorochovae Vshivkova, 1985
Species Sialis dorsata Say, 1823
Species Sialis dreisbachi Flint, 1964
Species Sialis elegans X.-y. Liu & D. Yang, 2006
Species Sialis flavicollis Enderlein, 1910
Species Sialis formosana Esben-Petersen, 1913
Species Sialis frequens Okamoto, 1905
Species Sialis fuliginosa F. Pictet, 1836
Species Sialis fumosa Navás, 1915
Species Sialis glabella Ross, 1937
Species Sialis gonzalezi Vshivkova, 1985
Species †Sialis groehni Wichard, 1997
Species Sialis hamata Ross, 1937
Species Sialis hasta Ross, 1937
Species Sialis henanensis X.-y. Liu & D. Yang, 2006
Species †Sialis herrlingi Wichard, 2002
Species Sialis imbecilla Say, 1823
Species Sialis immarginata Say, 1823
Species Sialis infumata Newman, 1838
Species Sialis iola Ross, 1937
Species Sialis itasca Ross, 1937
Species Sialis japonica van der Weele, 1909
Species Sialis jianfengensis D. Yang et al., 2002
Species Sialis joppa Ross, 1937
Species Sialis klingstedti Vshivkova, 1985
Species Sialis kunmingensis X.-y. Liu & D. Yang, 2006
Species Sialis levanidovae Vshivkova, 1980
Species Sialis longidens Klingstedt, (1932)
Species Sialis lutaria (Linnaeus, 1758)
Species Sialis martynovae Vshivkova, 1980
Species Sialis melania Nakahara, 1915
Subspecies Sialis melania kyushuensis Hayashi & Suda, 1995
Subspecies Sialis melania melania Nakahara, 1915
Subspecies Sialis melania tohokuensis Hayashi & Suda, 1995
Subspecies Sialis melania toyamaensis Hayashi & Suda, 1995
Species Sialis mohri Ross, 1937
Species Sialis morio Klingstedt, (1933)
Species Sialis morrisoni K. Davis, 1903
Species Sialis muratensis Nel, 1988
Species Sialis nevadensis K. Davis, 1903
Species Sialis nigripes E. Pictet, 1865
Species Sialis nina Townsend, 1939
Species Sialis occidens Ross, 1937
Species Sialis rotunda Banks, 1920
Species Sialis sibirica McLachlan, 1872
Species Sialis sinensis Banks, (1940)
Species Sialis sordida Klingstedt, (1933)
Species Sialis spangleri Flint, 1964
Species Sialis strausi Illies, 1967
Species Sialis vagans Ross, 1937
Species Sialis vanderweelei U. Aspöck & H. Aspöck, 1983
Species Sialis velata Ross, 1937
Species Sialis versicoloris X.-y. Liu & D. Yang, 2006
Species Sialis yamatoensis Hayashi & Suda, 1995
Species Sialis zhiltzovae Vshivkova, 1985
Genus Stenosialis Tillyard, (1919)
Species Stenosialis australiensis Tillyard, (1919)
Species Stenosialis hollowayi Theischinger, 1983

Sialis lutaria is the commonest alderfly in the United Kingdom and across much of Europe.

References

External links

 BugGuide
 Insects of Cedar Creek

Megaloptera
Aquatic insects